Avpixlat (lit. 'de-pixelated') was a Swedish online news site and blog with close ties to the Sweden Democrats and its parliamentarian Kent Ekeroth. The site describes itself as "an independent Sweden-friendly website for news and opinions". In 2017, it was replaced by Samhällsnytt.

The site has been labeled a racist hate-site, xenophobic and right-wing extremist by Swedish and international media. The site leaned close to the counter-jihad movement and supported Israel.

References

Swedish news websites
Propaganda in Sweden
Swedish nationalism
Counter-jihad